Boston railway station serves the town of Boston in Lincolnshire, England. It is on the Poacher Line.

The station is now owned by Network Rail and managed by East Midlands Railway who provide all rail services.

History

The station opened for service on 17 October 1848 with the opening of the Great Northern Railway East Lincolnshire line.

The station has declined in importance since the 1960s.  In its heyday the station employed over 50 staff and had two through tracks and cover over the platform tracks. The Skegness bound platform had classic Great Northern Railway architecture buildings as well, now replaced with plastic shelters.  The station frontage remains, albeit altered, in partially reconstructed manner, and some of the buildings have found new uses.

Boston station was once an important junction, with two lines diverging in either direction. Today, only the eastbound line to Skegness, and the westbound line towards Sleaford remain in use. There was previously a southbound line to Spalding (closed in October 1970) that joined the line to Peterborough (and formed part of the original GNR main line from London to York), and a north-westbound line to Woodhall Junction (closed in June 1963) and thence on towards Lincoln, Horncastle, or Louth.  Both surviving routes are single line, with a passing loop at the station.

To the south of the station the access to Boston Docks via the swing bridge and the site of the Broadfield Lane depot remain (the rail link into the docks still sees occasional use).  To the north along the old Lincoln to Boston and Horncastle route, about 2 miles north of the town is the old Hall Hills sleeper depot.

Station Masters

Mr. Carruthers ca. 1849
George Waghorn 1851 - 1855
George R.H. Mullins 1855 - 1871 (formerly station master at Doncaster)
John James Reading 1884 - 1899 (afterwards station master at Lincoln)
David J. Halliday 1899 - 1920
J.W. Malkinson 1920 - 1928
T. Day 1928 - 1933
Clifford G. Turner 1933 - 1937 (afterwards station master at Ardsley)
T.W. Croot 1937 - 1938 (afterwards station master at Spalding)
William P. Spinks 1939 -1949
H.B. Onyon 1949 - 1951 (afterwards station master at Peterborough East)
Charles Morris 1951 - 1955

Services
All services at Boston are operated by East Midlands Railway.

On Sundays, the service is served by a limited service in each direction, with additional services during the summer months. Enhancements to the Sunday service are due to be made during the life of the East Midlands franchise.

References

External links

Railway stations in Lincolnshire
DfT Category E stations
Former Great Northern Railway stations
Railway stations in Great Britain opened in 1848
Railway stations served by East Midlands Railway
Buildings and structures in Boston, Lincolnshire